The Kyrgyzstan Super Cup  is a football competition, held at the beginning of each domestic season and disputed between the winners of Kyrgyzstan League and the winners of Kyrgyzstan Cup. The first Kyrgyzstan Super Cup was held on 9 April 2011 at the Central Stadium in Kant, and was competed between Neftchi Kochkor-Ata and Dordoi Bishkek.

Winners

Top-performing clubs

References

(Russian)

Super Cup (Russian)

 
2
Kyrgyzstan